The 2008 New Zealand rugby league tour of Australia was a tour by the New Zealand national rugby league team to compete at the 2008 Rugby League World Cup. New Zealand came second in Group A of the tournament before winning their semi-finals against England and defeating Australia 34-20 in the final to win the World Cup for the first time.

Background
Alongside Australia and France, New Zealand had competed at all twelve previous World Cups. New Zealand finished runner up in 1988 and 2000.

The thirteenth World Cup was scheduled to be held in Australia in 2004, however the lack of international success by Great Britain and New Zealand after the 2000 World Cup and the rise of the Tri-Nations tournament meant that it was delayed for a further four years. The Rugby League International Federation officially announced this tournament on 6 May 2006, with further details on scheduling and dates following on 19 April 2007.

After the 2000 tournament, international football had focused on three Tri-Nations tournaments held between 2004 and 2006. New Zealand won the 2005 tournament but finished third in 2004 and second in 2006. New Zealand also lost 0-3 to Great Britain during the 2007 All Golds Tour and had not defeated Australia since the 2005 Tri-Nations tournament.

New Zealand was granted automatic entry into the World Cup.

Build up
Following the losses on the 2007 All Golds Tour Gary Kemble was fired as the New Zealand head coach, with Roy Asotasi and David Kidwell leading a public campaign to replace him. Kemble was replaced by Stephen Kearney as head coach and Wayne Bennett as assistant coach.

In Kearney's first match in charge, the New Zealand Kiwis played the annual ANZAC test against Australia at the Sydney Cricket Ground on 9 May 2008, losing 12-28. New Zealands squad was; Brent Webb (Leeds), Jason Nightingale (St George Illawarra), Setaimata Sa (Sydney Roosters), Iosia Soliola (Sydney Roosters), Sam Perrett (Sydney Roosters), Lance Hohaia (New Zealand), Thomas Leuluai (Wigan), Roy Asotasi (captain - South Sydney), Isaac Luke (South Sydney), Nathan Cayless (Parramatta), Sonny Bill Williams (Canterbury), Simon Mannering (New Zealand Warriors) and David Fa'alogo (South Sydney). Bench: Jeremy Smith (Melbourne), Dene Halatau (Wests Tigers), Adam Blair (Melbourne) and Frank Pritchard (Penrith).

During the 2008 NRL season, Sonny Bill Williams left the Canterbury Bulldogs and joined a French rugby union side, becoming unavailable for the Kiwis at the World Cup. Despite this, he was still named in the Kiwis training squad.

Staff
Head Coach: Stephen Kearney
Assistant Coach: Wayne Bennett

Squad

Training squad
New Zealand selectors named 47 NRL players and two from the Super League in a 49-man training squad.

Fraser Anderson, Roy Asotasi, Adam Blair, Nathan Cayless, Rangi Chase, Anthony Cherrington, Greg Eastwood, David Fa'alogo, Sonny Fai, Nathan Fien, Dene Halatau, Bronson Harrison, Weller Hauraki, Lance Hohaia, Krisnan Inu, Masada Iosefa, Shaun Kenny-Dowall, David Kidwell, Thomas Leuluai, Jeff Lima, Issac Luke, Simon Mannering, Sika Manu, Manase Manuokafoa, Benji Marshall, Steve Matai, Ben Matulino, Fui Fui Moimoi, Jason Nightingale, Eddie Paea, Sam Perrett, Frank Pritchard, Sam Rapira, Ben Roberts, Jerome Ropati, Setaimata Sa, Jeremy Smith, Iosia Soliola, Chase Stanley, Fetuli Talanoa, Taulima Tautai, Lee Te Maari, Ben Te'o, Taniela Tuiaki, Evarn Tuimavave, Manu Vatuvei, Cooper Vuna, Brent Webb, Sonny Bill Williams.

Final squad

1 Replaced originally named Iosia Soliola who withdrew due to injury on 21 October.

2 Replaced originally named Brent Webb and Jeff Lima who withdrew due to injury on 7 October.

Fixtures

Warm up matches

The New Zealand national rugby league team played two matches in New Zealand. As the All Golds they played a match against the New Zealand Māori in New Plymouth. They also defeated Tonga in a test match in Auckland.

World Cup Group A

Australia

Before this match an opening ceremony for the tournament was held.

The first points of the match came from a penalty kick by Johnathan Thurston (playing despite the murder of his uncle the previous day in a Brisbane park)  after New Zealand's Simon Mannering held Brett Stewart down for too long in a tackle at the 9-minute mark. Three minutes later the Kiwis were again penalised in their own territory when Steve Matai's swinging arm struck Paul Gallen in the head, the incident being placed on report. Australia opted to attack New Zealand's line and the first try of the match went to Greg Inglis who beat his opposite number Matai to dive over. Thurston's successful conversion gave the Kangaroos an 8 nil lead. Later as the Kiwis were on the attack, second-rower Sika Manu, playing his debut match for New Zealand, ran an inside line onto a Benji Marshall short ball and found a way through the middle of Australia's defence to touch down near the uprights just on 27 minutes. Matai's conversion brought the margin back to two points. Shortly after however, Australia struck back through debutant winger Joel Monaghan whose try was awarded by the on-field referee after the video official referred the decision back to him. Thurston's conversion gave the Kangaroos a 14 - 6 lead going into the half-time break.

Australia were again the first to score in the second half, this time on the right side, with Israel Folau's arm reaching out over one of his tacklers at the goal-line to plant the ball down in the 48th minute. Thurston missed his first kick of the night so the score was 18 - 6. Ten minutes later Brent Tate was being taken from the field with a neck injury just before the Australian halfback Thurston made a break mid-field and, as he was being brought to the ground by a defender, threw the ball back for Billy Slater to regather and score. Thurston then kicked the extras, pushing Australia's lead out to three converted tries with just under a quarter of the match remaining. With less than three minutes of game time left the Kiwis looked to have scored a consolation try when Jerome Ropati crashed over out wide, the decision being put to the video referee. The replay however showed that the Australian fullback, Slater, had slid across in desperation feet-first, knocking the ball from Ropati's grasp with his boot just before he could touch it to the ground. In the final seconds of the match Australia scored one more try when quick hands from Slater flicked the ball out wide for Folau who dived over for his second. Cameron Smith was assigned the conversion from the side-line and was successful, giving the Kangaroos a 30 - 6 victory.

Papua New Guinea
In the second week of the tournament, Group A's New Zealand and Papua New Guinea faced off at Queensland's Gold Coast. It was the first time the two countries had met since the Kiwis had a 64-0 win over the Kumuls at Palmerston North in 1996. Papua New Guinea made no changes to their side from the previous match, while New Zealand were without Steve Matai who was serving a suspension due to his high tackle on Australia's Paul Gallen in their previous match. This meant Krisnan Inu got his chance to play, and Sika Manu and Dene Halatau were also replaced by Isaac Luke and David Fa'alogo.

The first points came in the ninth minute when New Zealand, from fifteen metres out, moved the ball through the hands from the right side of the field out to the left, catching PNG's defence outnumbered so Jermoe Ropati could crossed untouched. Krisnan Inu's conversion attempt missed, leaving the score at 4 nil. Less than four minutes later it was Ropati again who fell over PNG's line, but was held up in goal. In the sixteenth minute the Kiwis again moved the ball out wide through the hands, this time to the right side where Simon Mannering was able to pass untouched between the thinly stretched defence to score. Inu kicked the extras and New Zealand were leading 10 nil. Mannering scored his second try eight minutes later, again on the right side of the field, after taking on the defensive line and breaking through. Inu's conversion was successful, taking New Zealand's lead out to 16 nil with fourteen minutes of the first half remaining. New Zealand's defence then withstood a series of assaults on their line when Papua New Guinea got repeat sets. Back in the Kumuls' half though, the Kiwis scored in the thirty-fourth minute, again on the right wing, when Benji Marshall threw an enormous cut out pass over to Sam Perrett who jogged over unchallenged by PNG's severely outnumbered defence. Inu's conversion made it 22 unanswered points by New Zealand and this would remain the scoreline at the half time break.

Marshall, New Zealand's key play maker, sat out the second half to ice a tightened hamstring muscle and after seven minutes it was Papua New Guinea who got the first points. On the left side of the field Neville Costigan got a pass out of a tackle to Jessie Joe Parker who also managed to pass from a tackle back inside for winger David Moore to race through some defenders and over the try-line, improving his kicker's field position by putting the ball down behind the uprights. Wilshere's simple conversion made the score 22 - 6. In the fifty-sixth minute, New Zealand returned to their try-scoring ways when Isaac Luke ran from dummy half thirty-seven metres out from Papua New Guinea's line and evaded a few defenders to score. Inu, however, missed the simple conversion. The Kiwis crossed again in the fifty-ninth minute from close range, Fa'alogo receiving a short ball from Fien and barging over the line. Isaac Luke missed the conversion so the score was 30–6 with a quarter of the match remaining. Less than ten minutes later, Adam Blair scored in the same spot, taking a short ball from dummy half Leuluai at close range and crashing over. Inu, making a return to the goal-kicking job, successfully converted the try. In the seventy-first minute, New Zealand were attacking again when Luke kicked high and to the left wing. Inu leapt for it but couldn't catch the ball and it ricocheted off the PNG defence before coming down for Sam Perrett to regather and ground. After examination by the video referee of a possible New Zealand knock on, the try was awarded due to the benefit of the doubt. Inu's conversion attempt was successful, bringing the score to 42–6. The Kiwis got one more try in the match when Greg Eastwood ran the ball from over thirty metres out, stepping and brushing past some defenders to score under the posts. The extras were kicked by Inu, leaving the final score at 48–6.

The loss for Papua New Guinea effectively ended their hopes of making the semi-finals, now requiring a win over Australia by an enormous margin to do so.

England
The last time the New Zealand and England sides met was in the semi-final of the 2000 World Cup, with the Kiwis winning 49 to 6. So far in this tournament both sides had defeated Papua New Guinea and lost to Australia. Changes to the New Zealand side were: Jason Nightingale in for Sam Perrett on the right wing; Steve Matai, after serving his one-match suspension, regained his place at right centre from Krisnan Inu; Evarn Tuimivave replaced Nathan Cayless in the front row (with Benji Marshall being named captain); David Fa'alogo was moved from the bench into Setaimata Sa's spot in the second row; Sam Rapira was dropped with David Kidwell and Bronson Harrison added to the bench.

England were the first to score after getting repeat sets which took them down close to New Zealand's line where hooker Mickey Higham pushed through the defence from dummy half in the 4th minute. The simple conversion was kicked by Rob Purdham so the score was 6 nil. Less than 4 minutes later England were working the ball out from their own 10-metre line when they decided to pass out wide to their centre Keith Senior, who beat the defence and raced down along the left wing. He then passed back inside for Rob Burrow running up in support and the diminutive halfback was away for England's second try. Purdham's conversion was successful so England were in front 12 nil with under ten minutes of the match gone. However New Zealand struck back just on 13 minutes after a break made by centre Jerome Ropati from a scrum win mid-field afforded Manu Vatuvei a run at the disorganised defence from within ten metres, the giant winger barging his way over for his first try of the tournament. The conversion attempt by Steve Matai was wide, so the score remained 12 - 4 in favour of England. At the sixteen-minute mark from a scrum win the English , Martin Gleeson made a sudden break from 30 metres out and was into open space, his run good enough for the momentum to drag him and his tackler over the try-line. The video referee awarded the four points and Purdham kicked the extra two so England's lead was pushed out to 18 - 4. In the 20th minute, the Kiwis were down close to the English try-line when New Zealand fullback Lance Hohaia dummied and stepped his way through the defensive line and fought his way through his tacklers to force the ball down, the video referee awarding the try after some deliberation. The kick from Matai missed so the score was 18 - 8 with three quarters of the match still remaining. Six minutes later, England were back deep in New Zealand's territory when Burrow at first-receiver and on the last tackle stepped and dashed through the defence to score his second try of the night. Purdham's conversion put the score at England 24, New Zealand 8. A few minutes later play was halted while Kiwi centre Steve Matai was taken from the field after falling into a tackle awkwardly and injuring his neck. New Zealand, ten metres into England's half and before the first tackle of a new set of six, offloaded from some tackles and kept the ball alive before sending it out to Jason Nightingale on the right wing where he dived over in the corner. Isaac Luke was given the sideline conversion attempt and kicked it, putting New Zealand back in the contest at 24 - 14, with three minutes of the first half remaining. No more points were scored before the break.

In the 47th minute, New Zealand were on the attack and were the first to score in the second half when a long pass from Hohaia out to Vatuvei saw him dive over untouched in the left corner for his second try of the match. The video referee awarded the try and Luke's sideline conversion attempt was wide, so the score was New Zealand 18, England 24. The Kiwi's then continued dominating possession and field position and in the 55th minute Vatuvei scored his 3rd, again diving over untouched in the corner after receiving a long ball from Hohaia. Once more Luke had to kick for goal from the sideline and this time was successful so the scores were level at 24 all. In the 69th minute, Luke gained his team a penalty when he was given a push by an England player while running in to contest a bomb and fell to the ground. The Kiwis decided to take the kick from in front of the posts and Luke got the two points which put New Zealand in the lead for the first time at 26 - 24. New Zealand were attacking England's line again in the 75th minute when an English defender fumbled an intercept chance and from the confusion Nathan Fein, who was playing on despite a broken nose, picked up the ball and crashed over. The try was awarded by the video referee and the conversion was kicked by Jeremy Smith, so New Zealand led 32 to 24 with 5 minutes of the match remaining. The Kiwis got one more try, again from Lance Hohaia throwing a long ball out to Manu Vatuvei to cross untouched on the left wing once more, his fourth try for the night. Benji Marshall took the sideline conversion attempt and missed, but the game was already beyond doubt, with New Zealand winning 36 - 24.

Manu Vatuvei's four tries saw him break the record of three previously held by Robbie Paul and Lesley Vainikolo for most tries in a World Cup match by a New Zealand player.

Semi-final

In a re-play of both sides' last match, New Zealand once again faced England, this time for the right to play in the World Cup final. English coach Tony Smith left it to within an hour of kick-off before naming his team for the match. Kevin Sinfield was dropped from his position on the bench. Ben Westwood was promoted from the bench to the run-on side. For New Zealand Jason Nightingale was replaceed by Sam Perrett. Sika Manu's faster than expected recovery from an eye socket injury saw his return with David Kidwell dropped in his place.

No British side had won in Brisbane for 46 years. New Zealand had lost their last 8 international matches in the city.

This time when the Kiwis performed their haka, the England side stood in a line ten metres away and faced them.

In the ninth minute New Zealand were on the attack courtesy of a mistake from England and got the first try of the match, passing to Sam Perrett on the right wing who crossed out wide, then improved his kicker's position before putting the ball down. Jeremy Smith's conversion was successful so England trailed 6–nil. England, also benefitting from some New Zealand mistakes, were attacking the Kiwis' line and threw the ball out wide to the right wing as well and Ade Gardner dived over in the corner just before the fifteen-minute mark. The video referee showed that Gardner's toe touched the sideline before he grounded the ball so the try was not given. Four minutes later the Kiwis were back down at England's end when Lance Hohaia got over for a close-range try. Smith's kick went wide so the score was 10–nil in favour of New Zealand with a quarter of the match gone. Rob Purdham's restart kick went over the sideline on the full so New Zealand got the ball back and in the following set of six they scored again through Jerome Ropati. Smith's kick was good this time, so the Kiwis had 16 unanswered points. Then in the twenty-ninth minute England had an opportunity in attack down at New Zealand's end and kept the ball alive, the ball going to captain Jamie Peacock who forced his way over from close range. Purdham missed the conversion attempt so the score remained 16–4 in favour of the Kiwis. A New Zealand knock-on less than two minutes from half time saw the English get a scrum a few metres into the opposition's half. In a bold set move from the scrum base, England's loose forward Purdham broke away with the ball and immediately kicked it ahead for Danny Maguire racing through to regather and dive over by the goal posts. The video referee ruled that the chaser was only just in line with the kicker so the try was awarded. Rob Burrow was given the conversion attempt and kicked it, so England were back within a converted try at 16–10 at the half-time break.

After a few minutes of the second half, England second-rower Gareth Ellis was forced from the field with a rib injury. Both sides had attacking opportunities during the first 16 minutes of the half, but it was New Zealand's Bronson Harrison who scored first after receiving a good short ball from halfback Nathan Fien on England's twenty metre line which saw him cut through the defence, step past the fullback and score by the uprights. Smith's conversion meant the score was New Zealand 22, England 10 with twenty-two minutes of the match remaining. After a bomb from England which Hohaia failed to take securely, England were on the attack again. They moved the ball out through the hands to the right, and centre Martin Gleeseon dragged himself through the defence to reach out and score in the sixty-first minute. Burrow kicked the sideline conversion so England were back within a converted try of New Zealand at 22–16. The Kiwis then got repeat sets down near England's line and were the next to score: Fien kicked the ball over towards the goal posts and as it came down in-goal two English defenders failed to secure it and Jerome Ropati was there to fall onto it. Benji Marshall was given the conversion this time and kicked it successfully so the score was 28–16 with ten minutes to go. Three minutes later England gave themselves a glimmer of hope when Maguire found space between New Zealand's defence and ran through it from fifteen metres out to score by the posts. Burrow's conversion meant that England were back within six points with six minutes of the game left to go. However the English were let down by further handling errors and New Zealand were the last to score after England again failed to defend against a bomb out to the left, Marshall putting it down in the corner at the seventy-eighth minute, placing the game beyond doubt. Smith missed the sideline conversion so the final score was 32–22. England then went home with A$130,000 prize money and New Zealand had booked a place in the final the following week.

Final

Australia went into the match as clear favorites. They had won 9 of the previous 12 Rugby League world cup's including the last six consecutively. Australia had also not lost since 2006. New Zealand had won the Tri nations in 2005 but had lost to Australia eight times in a row since that victory. The TAB offered odds of more than 20 to one on a Kiwi win by more than 13 points and New Zealand were paying $6.25 to win at many outlets. Suncorp Stadium was sold out months in advance for the final. The captains of both teams, Nathan Cayless and Darren Lockyer, were the only players in this match who had also played in the 2000 Rugby League World Cup Final.

Australia took a 10-0 lead after 16 minutes before New Zealand closed the gap to trail 16-12 at half-time.

The Kiwis were leading 22-20 with 10 minutes remaining when Lance Hohaia was high tackled by Joel Monaghan as he attempted to gather a cross field kick. A penalty try was awarded and the score became 28-20. Adam Blair then scored to secure the match.

Aftermath
Following the final, hundreds of New Zealanders welcomed the team home at Auckland Airport.

The Kiwis were nominated for team of the year in the Halberg Awards but lost to the gold medal rowing pair of Caroline and Georgina Evers-Swindell

In 2010 the New Zealand Rugby League named their under-15s National Competition trophy the Nathan Cayless Cup, in recognition of the only captain to win the World Cup for New Zealand.

References

2008
World Cup
2008
2008 Rugby League World Cup